The Man in the Road is a 1956 British thriller film directed by Lance Comfort and starring Derek Farr, Ella Raines, Donald Wolfit and Cyril Cusack. The film was shot at Beaconsfield Studios. It was based on a popular contemporary novel He Was Found in the Road by Anthony Armstrong.

Plot
A brilliant scientist suffering from amnesia is hunted by Communist agents in search of a secret formula.

Cast
 Derek Farr as Ivan Mason/Doctor James Paxton 
 Ella Raines as Rhona Ellison 
 Donald Wolfit as Professor Cattrell 
 Lisa Daniely as Nurse Mitzi 
 Bruce Beeby as Doctor Manning 
 Russell Napier as Superintendent Davidson of Scotland Yard  
 Cyril Cusack as Doctor Kelly 
 Frederick Piper as Inspector Hayman 
 Karel Stepanek as Dmitri Balinkev 
 Olive Sloane as Mrs Lemming, the landlady 
 Alfred Maron as Ambulance driver 
 John Welsh as Employer
 Robert Bruce as  Scotland Yard Detective

Critical reception
 Britmovie called the film a "fast-paced, implausible, but engrossing Cold War spy thriller."
 TV Guide wrote, "the complicated plot never really amounts to anything more than predictable propaganda, though a  capable cast handles the material in a professional and convincing manner."

References

Bibliography
 Chibnall, Steve & McFarlane, Brian. The British 'B' Film. Palgrave MacMillan, 2009.

External links
 

1956 films
1950s spy thriller films
British spy thriller films
Films directed by Lance Comfort
Cold War spy films
Films about amnesia
Films based on British novels
Films shot at Beaconsfield Studios
1950s English-language films
1950s British films
British black-and-white films